There was also a Caucasian Albanian anti-Catholicos Nerses V, who ruled in 1706–1736.

Nerses V (1770 – February 13, 1857), served as the Catholicos of the Armenian Apostolic Church between 1843 and 1857.  Previously, he served as the leader of Diocese of Georgia from 1811 to 1830, the leader of the Diocese of Bessarabia and Nor Nakhichevan from 1830 to 1843.

Nerses V is buried near Mother Cathedral of Holy Etchmiadzin.

Gallery

See also 
Nersisyan School, was founded by Nerses Ashtaraketsi in 1824

References 

ՆԵՐՍԵՍ ԱՇՏԱՐԱԿԵՑԻ
ՆԵՐՍԵՍ ԱՇՏԱՐԱԿԵՑՈՒ ՀՈՒՇԱՐՁԱՆԸ
Ներսես Ե Աշտարակեցի

Catholicoi of Armenia
Armenian philosophers
1770 births
1857 deaths
People from Ashtarak